Dunedin is the second-largest city in the South Island of New Zealand.

Dunedin may also refer to:

Places
 Dunedin, Ontario, Canada
 Dunedin (New Zealand electorate), a former electorate, 1853–1905
 Edinburgh, whose Scottish Gaelic name is Dùn Èideann
 Dunedin, Florida, United States

Other
 Dunedin River, a river in British Columbia, Canada
 Dunedin Consort, an Edinburgh-based choral ensemble founded in 1996
 HMS Dunedin, a Royal Navy light cruiser in the Second World War
 Dunedin (ship), the first commercial ship with refrigeration equipment
 Dunedin City AFC, a former New Zealand football club
 Dunedin Multidisciplinary Health and Development Study (a.k.a. the Dunedin Study), a detailed study of human health, development and behaviour, based at the University of Otago in New Zealand

See also
 Edinburgh (disambiguation)
 Dúnedain, a race of men in n J. R. R. Tolkien's legendarium
 Duneedon a.k.a. Don Edon, a character in the children's educational television series Read All About It!